Eddontenajon/Iskut Village Airport, formerly , was a registered aerodrome located  north of Eddontenajon, British Columbia, Canada.

References

External links
Page about this airport on COPA's Places to Fly airport directory

Defunct airports in British Columbia
Regional District of Kitimat–Stikine